The Yavoriv military base was attacked by Russian forces on 13 March 2022 as part of the Russian invasion of Ukraine in 2022. The base is located near the city of Yavoriv, Lviv Oblast, less than 15 miles from the border with Poland. According to Ukrainian officials, the military facility was hit by 30 Russian missiles, with initial reports stating between 35 and more than 40 Ukrainian soldiers were killed and 134 others were injured. According to Russian officials, '180 foreign mercenaries' were killed. Later, the Ukrainian police confirmed 61 people were killed and 160 were injured.

Events
As many as 1,000 foreign fighters had been training at the base as part of the Ukrainian Foreign Legion. Air raid sirens sounded during the night and though automated air defense equipment arrested some incoming ordinance, several buildings including the headquarters were struck with cruise missiles carrying payloads of up to 500kg. Volunteers repositioned into the woods and over 50 were injured in the ensuing panic.

The Russian Ministry of Defence announced that it had destroyed "up to 180 foreign mercenaries and a large consignment of foreign weapons" and said that Russia would continue attacks on foreign fighters in Ukraine; the Ukrainian Ministry of Defence said that it had not confirmed any foreigners among the dead. On 14 March, British newspaper The Mirror said that at least three British ex-special forces volunteers may have been killed in the attack, with the total amount of dead volunteers potentially surpassing one hundred. On 17 March, a German volunteer who survived the attack told the Austrian Newspaper Heute that at least 100 foreign volunteers had been present at the moment one of the buildings was destroyed, and none survived. He said the death toll released by the Ukrainian government only accounted for Ukrainian personnel.

In an interview with Última Hora, the mother of Spanish soldier Angel Martinez, who died on 18 June, said that "When there was an attack in Lviv, he contacted me because he was very scared. He wrote to me that he was on guard duty when they were bombed. He told me that 138 people were killed and 48 were injured. They weren't allowed to send pictures."

Ukraine's Defence Minister Oleksii Reznikov described the strike as  a "terrorist attack on peace and security near the EU-Nato border". A NATO official stated that there were no NATO personnel at the base, as all personnel had left the country prior to the invasion.

References 

Ukraine–NATO relations
History of Lviv Oblast
March 2022 events in Ukraine
Airstrikes during the 2022 Russian invasion of Ukraine
Airstrikes conducted by Russia